Hebbariye, Hebbariyeh, Hebbariya or Hebariya   is a village and municipality situated in the Hasbaya District of the Nabatieh Governorate in Lebanon. It is located on the southwestern slopes of Mount Hermon near the Lebanon–Syria border, northeast of Rachaya Al Foukhar and is positioned amongst orchards of apricot trees. There it is a roman temple.

The village sits c.  above sea level and the small population is predominantly support the Lebanese Communist party

Roman temple
 There is a Roman temple near to the village, opposite the Wadi Shib'a which is the most southern of the Temples of Mount Hermon, a group defined by George Taylor as being south of the main road to Damascus on the west of Mount Hermon, including the Wadi al-Taym area. It has been classified as an Antae temple with an eastern portal that faces Mount Hermon, aligned "as if to catch the first beams of the morning sun rising over Hermon." The temple has a large basement chamber underneath the cella floors that is thought to have been used for burial. The room is only accessible from the outside of the building. The capitals appeared to be of an Ionic style. At the entrance doorway, there are two tiers of niches with some engraved writing beneath the upper set.

References

Bibliography

 (pp.285-286)

 
  (pp. 493-496)

External links
Photos of Hebbariye and the Roman temple on panoramio.com
3D Google Earth map of Hebbariye on www.gmap3d.com
Hebbariya on wikimapia
Hebbariyeh on www.localiban.org
Image of the temple at Hebbariye from "Palestine 1881 Ruins Temple Hebbariyeh Mount Hermon", A page taken from Picturesque Palestine, Sinai and Egypt. Edited by Charles Wilson, 1881, p. 126. on Amazon.com
Full text of Picturesque Palestine, Sinai and Egypt. Edited by Charles Wilson, 1881.

Populated places in Hasbaya District
Archaeological sites in Lebanon
Ancient Roman temples
Roman sites in Lebanon
Tourist attractions in Lebanon
Sunni Muslim communities in Lebanon
Mount Hermon